Lkhagvyn Tsedevsuren  is a Mongolian politician currently serving as Minister of Education and Science since July 2020.

References

Living people
1967 births
21st-century Mongolian women politicians
21st-century Mongolian politicians
Education ministers of Mongolia
Women government ministers of Mongolia
People from Govi-Altai Province